Veylehi-ye Melah Rash (also Romanized as Veylehī-ye Melah Rash; also known as Veyleh-ye Melah Rash) is a village in Zamkan Rural District in the Central District of Salas-e Babajani County, Kermanshah Province, Iran. According to the 2006 census, its population was 32 people from 8 families.

References 

Populated places in Salas-e Babajani County